Neville Roy Hamilton (19 April 1960 – 9 February 2009) was an English footballer and coach.

Hamilton was born in Leicester and began his career at hometown club Leicester City, making his debut against Manchester United on 27 December 1977. He went on to play five first-team games for Leicester, before leaving to join Mansfield Town in January 1979. Hamilton would go on to play 89 matches for the Stags in two-and-a-half seasons at Field Mill.

In August 1981, Hamilton joined Rochdale, where he spent three seasons, and in the summer of 1984, he joined Wolverhampton Wanderers. However, he never played a competitive match for Wolves, and was forced to retire from the game after suffering a heart attack during pre-season training in 1984.

After his enforced departure from the playing side of the game, Hamilton became a coach. He returned to his first club Leicester City, where he became part of the club's youth department, helping to shape the careers of players like Emile Heskey and Richard Stearman.

Hamilton died on 9 February 2009 at Glenfield Hospital in Leicester, aged 48. He had been hospitalised for a while and had heart surgery the week before his death.

References

1960 births
2009 deaths
English footballers
Footballers from Leicester
Leicester City F.C. players
Mansfield Town F.C. players
Rochdale A.F.C. players
Wolverhampton Wanderers F.C. players
English Football League players
Association football midfielders